The men's 800 metres event at the 1994 European Athletics Championships was held in Helsinki, Finland, at Helsinki Olympic Stadium on 11, 12, and 14 August 1994.

Medalists

Results

Final
14 August

Semi-finals
12 August

Semi-final 1

Semi-final 2

Heats
11 August

Heat 1

Heat 2

Heat 3

Heat 4

Participation
According to an unofficial count, 30 athletes from 17 countries participated in the event.

 (2)
 (1)
 (1)
 (3)
 (3)
 (2)
 (2)
Independent European Participants (Yugoslavia) (1)
 (1)
 (3)
 (1)
 (3)
 (1)
 (1)
 (1)
 (3)
 (1)

References

800 metres
800 metres at the European Athletics Championships